Solange Charest (born August 3, 1950 in Amqui, Quebec) is a Quebec politician. She was a Member of the National Assembly of Quebec for the riding of Rimouski from 1994 to 2007, representing the Parti Québécois.

References

External links

1950 births
Women MNAs in Quebec
French Quebecers
Living people
Parti Québécois MNAs
People from Amqui
21st-century Canadian politicians
21st-century Canadian women politicians